Angus Og or Angus the younger may refer to:

 Aengus, Celtic God of Love
 Angus Og (comic strip)
 Aonghus Óg of Islay (died 1314×1318/c.1330), Scottish magnate
 Aonghas Óg (d. 1490), bastard son of John of Islay, Earl of Ross and Lord of the Isles
 Angus Og MacDonald (d.1615)
 Aonghus Óg McAnally, (born 1980), Irish actor

Og, Angus